Papillon is a name meaning "butterfly" in French.

Notable people with the name include:

Annick Papillon (born 1980), Canadian politician
Godfrey Papillon (1867–1942), English cricketer
Jean-François Papillon (died 1805), African-born slave in Haiti
John Papillon (cricketer) (1806–1889), English cricketer
John Papillon (1838–1891), British photographer and army engineer
Thomas Papillon (1623–1702), English merchant and politician
Papillon Soo Soo (born 1961), British-Chinese model and actress